Amauna may refer to the following places in the Indian state of Bihar:

Amauna, Araria
Amauna (Barun), Aurangabad
Amauna (Nabinagar), Aurangabad
Amauna, Rohtas